Frederic Lawrence Holmes (6 February 1932, Cincinnati, Ohio – 21 March 2003, New Haven, Connecticut) was an American historian of science, specifically for chemistry, medicine and biology.

Holmes earned his bachelor's degree in biology from Massachusetts Institute of Technology (MIT) in 1954 and then began graduate study in the history department of Harvard University, where he graduated with MA in 1958. His graduate study was interrupted by two years of service in the United States Air Force and when he returned to Harvard he transferred to the department of the history of science, graduating with PhD in 1962 with thesis Claude Bernard and the concept of internal environment. For his dissertation, he reconstructed Claude Bernard's path of discovery of basic physiological functions, such as those of the liver, on the basis of Bernard's laboratory books from the 1840s. Mirko Grmek referred the laboratory books to Holmes. He then spent two years at MIT as a postdoc. At Yale University he became in 1964 an assistant professor and in 1968 an associate professor of the history of science. In 1972 he became a professor at the University of Western Ontario and head of his department. In 1979 he returned to Yale as a full professor and chair from 1979 to 2002 of the Section of the History of Medicine in the Yale School of Medicine.

He became Avalon Professor in 1985, and from 1982 to 1987 was Master of Jonathan Edwards College. He became a leading force in building the history of science and medicine at Yale. He initiated an undergraduate major in the history of science/history of medicine and in 1986 a graduate program in the history of medicine and the life sciences. In 2002 he helped establish a new Program in the History of Medicine and Science.

Holmes was the author of more than sixty papers and several books on the history of medicine and the biological sciences. For his two-volume work on Hans Adolf Krebs and the discovery of the citric acid cycle, Holmes not only evaluated Krebs's lab books, but also conducted detailed interviews with Krebs. Holmes won several prizes and was a leading contributor to the history of medicine and the biological sciences for two generations.

 

He and his wife Harriet Vann Holmes (d. 2000) had three daughters.

Awards and honors
 1962 — Schumann Prize of the History of Science Society
 1975 — Pfizer Award of the History of Science Society
 1978 — William H. Welch Medal of American Association for the History of Medicine
 1981–1983 — President of the History of Science Society
 1994 — Dexter Award for Outstanding Achievement in the History of Chemistry from the American Chemical Society.
 1994 — Fellow of the American Academy of Arts and Sciences
 2000 — George Sarton Medal of the History of Science Society
 2000 — Member of the American Philosophical Society

Selected publications
 Claude Bernard and Animal Chemistry, Harvard University Press 1974
 Lavoisier and the Chemistry of Life: an exploration of scientific creativity, Princeton University Press, 1985; Reprint University of Wisconsin Press, 1987
 Antoine Lavoisier - the next crucial year: or, the sources of his quantitative method in chemistry, Princeton University Press 1997; Reprint (pbk), 2014
 Hans Krebs: the formation of a scientific life 1900–1933, Oxford University Press 1991
 Hans Krebs: Architect of intermediary metabolism 1933–1937, Oxford University Press 1993
 Meselson, Stahl and the Replication of DNA: A history of the most beautiful experiment in biology, Yale University Press 2001; Reprint (pbk), 2008 (See also Meselson–Stahl experiment.)
 Investigative Pathways: pattern and stages in the careers of experimental scientists, Yale University Press 2004
 with William C. Summers: Reconceiving the gene: Seymour Benzer's adventures in phage genetics, Yale University Press 2006; Reprint (pbk), 2008
 Historians and Contemporary Scientific Biography, Pauling Symposium 1995

References

American historians of science
Massachusetts Institute of Technology School of Science alumni
Harvard University alumni
Academic staff of the University of Western Ontario
Yale University faculty
Fellows of the American Academy of Arts and Sciences
Members of the American Philosophical Society
1932 births
2003 deaths

External links
 Frederic Lawrence Holmes Papers (MS 1835). Manuscripts and Archives, Yale University Library.